Mold Community Hospital is a community hospital in Mold, Flintshire, Wales. It is managed by the Betsi Cadwaladr University Health Board.

History
The hospital has its origins in the old Mold Cottage Hospital in 1877. The current modern facility, which was built just to the west of the old hospital, opened in 1985. The architects of the Welsh Health Common Services Authority won the Gold Medal for Architecture at the National Eisteddfod of Wales of 1986 for their work on the new Mold Community Hospital. Two wards in the new hospital were refurbished in 2017.

References

NHS hospitals in Wales
Hospitals established in 1877
Hospital buildings completed in 1985
Hospitals in Flintshire
Mold, Flintshire
Betsi Cadwaladr University Health Board
Welsh Eisteddfod Gold Medal winners
1877 establishments in Wales